Cruise is the sixteenth studio album by power electronics band Whitehouse, released in 2001 through the band's Susan Lawly label. The album was reissued on double vinyl format through Very Friendly in 2007, and was the first of a series of limited edition vinyl reissues of the band's catalog.

IDM musician Aphex Twin once played a remixed version of the title track at the 2001 Sónar festival. He has also played the track "Public" during a special "headphone" set at Barbican, London, in which one reviewer of the show called the track "unnecessary, exploitative, and cheap".

Track listing
All songs written by William Bennett, except for "Public", written by Peter Sotos

Personnel
William Bennett - vocals, synthesizer, production
Philip Best - vocals, synthesizer
Peter Sotos - synthesizer
Denis Blackham - mastering
Steve Albini - recording (on "Public")

References

External links
 

2001 albums
Whitehouse (band) albums